The 1928 LSU Tigers football team represented Louisiana State University (LSU) in the 1928 Southern Conference football season.

Jess Tinsley was named first team All-Southern for the second year in a row, playing weak side tackle. First year coach Russ Cohen, himself a former All-Southern end at Vanderbilt, claimed that Tinsley was "the finest tackle he had ever seen.

Schedule

References

LSU
LSU Tigers football seasons
LSU Tigers football